is the twentieth single by Japanese singer Ai Otsuka under the label Avex Trax. It was released on April 7, 2010, more than a year after her last single "Bye Bye".

The single reached the sixth position on the Oricon weekly singles chart and charted for five weeks. It was released in CD-only and CD+DVD formats.

The song "Zokkondition" was used in two commercials, one for Asahi Breweries and another for Music.jp. The song "Lucky Star" was used in Japan as the theme song by Fuji TV for the 2010 Winter Olympics.

Track listing

References

Ai Otsuka songs
2010 singles
Songs written by Ai Otsuka
Avex Trax singles
2010 songs